Mikel Santamaría Ciprián (born 20 July 1987) is a Spanish footballer who plays for CD Tudelano as a central defender.

Club career
Born in Pamplona, Navarre, Santamaría finished his development at CA Osasuna, and made his senior debut with the reserves in the Segunda División B. In 2008, he signed with CD Alfaro of the same league.

Santamaría joined Athletic Bilbao in the summer of 2009, being assigned to the B team also in the third division. He subsequently represented, still in that tier, Albacete Balompié and CD Leganés, being promoted to Segunda División with the latter club at the end of the 2013–14 season.

On 24 August 2014, Santamaría played his first match as a professional, starting in a 1–1 home draw against Deportivo Alavés. On 21 July of the following year, he moved to Racing de Santander, recently relegated from division two.

Personal life
Ciprián's older brother, Roberto, was also a footballer. A goalkeeper, he too was groomed at Osasuna.

References

External links

1987 births
Living people
Spanish footballers
Footballers from Pamplona
Association football defenders
Segunda División players
Segunda División B players
Segunda Federación players
CA Osasuna B players
Bilbao Athletic footballers
Albacete Balompié players
CD Leganés players
Racing de Santander players
Hércules CF players
UD Logroñés players
CD Calahorra players
Racing Rioja CF players
CD Tudelano footballers